Devata is the Hindu term for guardian spirits, and the plural form of Deva.

Devata or Devatha may also refer to:

 Devata (1941 film), Telugu film
 Devata (1965 film), Telugu film
 Devatha (1965 film), Malayalam film
 Devata (1978 film), Hindi film
  Devata (1982 film), Telugu film

See also
 Devathai, a 1997 Tamil fantasy film
 Devathai (2013 TV series), an Indian Tamil-language soap opera